The Christian festival of Easter is celebrated in Latvia as Lieldienas. Lieldienas enters Holy Week with Palm Sunday, Maundy Thursday, Good Friday and Holy Saturday, but Sunday will mark first Lieldienas. Second Lieldienas is on Monday of the following week. Each day has a special significance. Also, many pagan elements of celebrating Lieldienas have become a tradition.kids

Lieldienas dates 

Nowadays, the common date of Lieldienas is the first Sunday after the first full moon,  after or during the vernal equinox. Thus, the Western Christian Church Lieldienas falls on a date between 22 March and 25 April. In Eastern Orthodox Churches, which used the Julian calendar, Lieldienas falls on a date between 4 April and 8 May in Gregorian calendar.

Latvian customs of celebrating Lieldienas 
Before the arrival of Christianity, Lieldienas was a spring equinox event, celebrating the victory of light over darkness.

Egg-related beliefs 
Although dainas have no conclusive indication of egg painting tradition in ancient times, the majority of them mention golden, silver and white eggs. Therefore, it can be concluded that egg painting is more of a modern tradition. In order for eggs to be diverse, they were boiled with colorful cloth. In one area, grits are poured in, while in other, people added colorful birch leaves, fir needles, cells, a variety of flowers, herbs or just reel them with a colorful yarn. Every family have a different way of following this tradition.

Wizards also colored eggs in ancient times and laid them under the horse or cattle's troughs, to cast a misfortune of cattle plague on whoever they wanted. People were afraid of such wizard's eggs.

People believed that particular magical power was inherent even in water, which boiled eggs. They believed it helped to ward off hawks from chickens: the swishing sauna whisks were hooked between the fence poles on Lieldienas morning and were filled with water which was used to boil eggs.

While eating an egg, people watched how the eggshell separated - if it came off well, it meant the flax will grow well; if it shed badly, then it meant a bad flax harvest. Eggs also involved in a lot of other beliefs:

 Who steals a Lieldienas egg - will remain naked like an egg!
 Who eats a Lieldienas egg without salt - will lie all summer!
 Exchange eggs during Lieldienas - otherwise chickens will not lay and chicks will not hatch!
 If a girl during Lieldienas gives to a guy 2 eggs, it would imply - I don't like you; if 3 - better than nothing; if 4 - I don't like you, but since you're rich, I will be with you; if 5 - I have been waiting for you for a long time, come, take me!

Swing-related beliefs 
Hanging swings and selecting a place was a special honorable duty. Swings were usually made from oak or ashen poles.  Swings location was chosen on the hill, between 2 oak trees.  Along with the swinging occurred a great singing. Guys, who swung with girls, were gifted with eggs, and even gloves and socks. Swinging lasts for 1 week after Lieldienas, and then the swings were burned, so witches could not swing on them.

The celebration could not go on without beating eggs. Each received their egg in their hands and thought of a wish; then 2 people clapped their eggs with thin ends together. Whose egg does not break - their wish would come true. Eggs were also rolled - via a special chute.

One of the oldest performances is bird healing. Birds symbolized evil and disease. By driving them away from the fences and fields, it was believed that all evil and accidents would be dispelled.

When the sun rose on Lieldienas morning, just above the horizon, people swung 3 times on one side of a swing, and 3 times on the other side. It was caused by the habit of swinging on Lieldienas. Before swinging, people walked around the swings 3 times, singing songs, then guys threw eggs over poles, predicting their lifespan, and only then they began to swing.

In other areas, the first Lieldienas held an egg hunt.  Young boys went to the neighboring houses, searching for Lieldienas eggs. Eggs were requested by the girls, which was the main reason for looting.

Several folk songs mention that people celebrated Lieldienas 4 days, some of them mention only 3. Beliefs also mention 4 days. For example, one belief says "do not work for 4 days of Lieldienas - children from other houses will begin to limp". Therefore, one can think that in the past, along with Ziemassvētki,  Latvians celebrated Lieldienas for 4 days. Later on, both festivals were reduced to 1 day.

Other Lieldienas beliefs 
 Before the sunrise, go to the barn to pick up crumbs, so that the money stays.
 Wake up as early as possible on Lieldiena morning, in order to do your job well all year, just put on a new shirt and go whip the sleep away.
 On Lieldienas morning, water from every (toward the sun's current position) rivers is holy. Use water, which flows toward the sun, - living water- to wash mouth, so no one could harm you. It can be collected and it does not go bad all year. It can be used to bless buildings — such as barns, so that goblins and insects do not enter them.
 Trim finger nails before the sunrise, so that eyes won't hurt. Also the rag is pulled over the pasture — to collect dew. The rag collected dew and were given to cows to drink.
 On Lieldienas, lie down on dew, in order to be healthy all year round.
 On the crossroads, where the fairies live and being vices of home, sweep rubbish before the sunrise, to chase away insects. Hence — donate to crossroads spirits, or to Māras of dark dimension (whom Greeks called Hecate, while Indians called Kali.)
 Lieldienas requires a lot of swinging - so you would not oversleep throughout the whole year!
 With a tar draw signs on the barn doors to prevent changeling. — What signs are drawn? — The Incubus cross - either with 5, or 8 lines, and 3 toads, which are considered to be a sign of wealth. Draw fire crosses — to ward off evil spirits and a few more characters.
 Judging by what drawn on new safety signs, the prohibitions are known — such as do not leave clothes outside for a night and do not give milk to strangers, so cattle are could not be enchanted. In the morning, before sunrise, go around the house 3 times with a scythe over shoulder — to chase away the evil spirits.
 In order for cows to not gallop, ride around your borders on a broom 3 times, during the sunless Lieldienas morning. If on Lieldienas night you run around house with a rowan club — that house cannot be enchanted.
 Go to Golden Coffee in Riga and ask for the "Lamb Special".

External links
 Latvian traditional seasonal rhythms
 Latvian dainas about Lieldienas

Public holidays in Latvia
Latvia
Christianity in Latvia
Latvian mythology
Spring (season) events in Latvia